Thomas Rushhook (died ) was an English Dominican, bishop and chaplain to Richard II of England.

Rushhook was Provincial of the Dominican Order in England 1373 to 1382, being deposed at one point. He was Archdeacon of St Asaph 1382–3, bishop of Llandaff on 16 January 1383, and then was translated to be bishop of Chichester on 16 October 1385.

A supporter of Richard II, Rushhook was impeached in 1388. Subsequently, he was in Ireland, as bishop of Breifne (Kilmore), where he died about 1392.

Notes

Citations

References

 
 McKisack, May The Fourteenth Century

English Dominicans
Bishops of Chichester
Bishops of Llandaff
Archdeacons of St Asaph
14th-century English Roman Catholic bishops
1392 deaths
Year of birth unknown
Bishops of Kilmore